Venkatapur is a village in Bhatkal Taluk in Uttara Kannada district of Karnataka.

Etymology 

Venkatapur derives its name from Shree Lakshmi Venkatesh Temple.

Demographics
 India census, Venkatapur had a population of 5968. Males constitute 48% of the population and females 52%. Venkatapur has an average literacy rate of 73%, higher than the national average of 59.5%: male literacy is 76%, and female literacy is 70%. In Venkatapur, 15% of the population is under 6 years of age.

See also 
 Kundapur
 Mangalore
 Karwar

References

Villages in Uttara Kannada district